The Death Train (alternately titled Death Train) is a 1978 Australian made-for-television horror thriller film directed by Igor Auzins, and starring Hugh Keays-Byrne and Max Meldrum.

It was produced by Robert Bruning's Gemini Productions.

Plot

A dead man is discovered at the bottom of his garden. It appears he has been hit by a train even though no train has run along those tracks for years.

Cast
 Hugh Keays-Byrne as Ted Morrow
 Ingrid Mason as Vera
 Max Meldrum as Johnny Loomis
 Ken Goodlet as Sergeant McMasters
 Brian Wenzel as Peter Murdoch
 Colin Taylor as Herbert Cook

Production
The film was shot in Sydney. Shooting started September 1977.

Reception
Don Groves of the Sydney Morning Herald said "Bruning has made some terrific thrillers, but this isn't one of them. After an intriguing opening, The Death Train simply runs off the rails... the script is given such tongue-in-cheek treatment, it's little more than a farce."

Charles Tatum from eFilmCritic rated the film a negative two out of five stars, criticizing the film's script, and editing.

Dave Sindelar from Fantastic Movie Musings and Ramblings gave the film a positive review, stating that the film's overall quirkiness (from its bizarre mystery, offbeat characters, and surreal humor) worked in its favor.

References

External links
 
 
 
 
 The Death Train at Screen Australia
 Death Train at AustLit (subscription required)

1978 horror films
1978 television films
1978 films
1970s horror thriller films
Australian horror thriller films
Australian television films
Horror television films
Films directed by Igor Auzins
1970s English-language films